
This is a list of players who graduated from the Challenge Tour in 2011. The top 20 players on the Challenge Tour's money list in 2011 earned their European Tour card for 2012.

* European Tour rookie in 2012
T = Tied 
 The player retained his European Tour card for 2013 (finished inside the top 118).
 The player did not retain his European Tour Tour card for 2013, but retained conditional status (finished between 119-155).
 The player did not retain his European Tour card for 2013 (finished outside the top 155).

Hébert earned a direct promotion to the European Tour after his third win of 2011 in August; Little did the same in October.

Winners on the European Tour in 2012

Runners-up on the European Tour in 2012

See also
2011 European Tour Qualifying School graduates

External links 
Final ranking for 2011

Challenge Tour
European Tour
Challenge Tour Graduates
Challenge Tour Graduates